Mowersville is an unincorporated community in Lurgan Township in northern Franklin County, in the U.S. state of Pennsylvania.

History
A post office called Mowersville was established in 1868, and remained in operation until 1955. The community was named after Joseph Mower, a first settler.

References

Unincorporated communities in Franklin County, Pennsylvania
Unincorporated communities in Pennsylvania